Top Country Albums is a chart that ranks the top-performing country music albums in the United States, published by Billboard.  In 1966, 17 different albums topped the chart, which was at the time published under the title Hot Country Albums, based on sales reports submitted by a representative sample of stores nationwide.

In the issue of Billboard dated January 1, Connie Smith was at number one with Cute 'n' Country, the album's second week in the top spot.  The following week it was displaced from the top spot by My World by Eddy Arnold, which spent eleven consecutive weeks atop the chart, the year's longest unbroken run in the top spot.  Arnold would return to number one for two weeks in April with I Want to Go with You and for a single week in September with The Last Word in Lonesome.  Buck Owens and his Buckaroos also achieved three chart-toppers during the year, spending a total of 15 weeks in the top spot with Roll Out the Red Carpet for Buck Owens and his Buckaroos, Dust on Mother's Bible and the live recording Carnegie Hall Concert.  Between late 1965 and early 1968 Owens and his band placed 12 albums on the chart, only one of which failed to reach number one, however after that the group never topped the chart again.  The only artist other than Arnold and Owens to achieve more than one chart-topping album in 1966 was Connie Smith, who returned to the top spot for a single week in December with Born to Sing, which would prove to be her final number-one album.

Four singers who would go on to become amongst the most successful in country music history gained their first number-one albums in the second half of 1966.  In August George Jones reached the top spot for the first time with I'm a People, and in November You Ain't Woman Enough was the first chart-topper for Loretta Lynn.  In December Merle Haggard, along with his long-time backing band the Strangers, reached the top spot for the first time with Swinging Doors/The Bottle Let Me Down, and Sonny James did the same with the compilation album The Best of Sonny James.  Jones, despite many problems in his personal life, accrued more than 150 hit singles and was acclaimed as the greatest vocalist in country music.  Haggard achieved nearly 40 number ones on the country singles chart and has been called one of the genre's greatest songwriters.  Lynn, who experienced success in six decades and was nominated for a Grammy Award in 2018 at the age of 86, is regarded as one of the most influential female artists in country music and has been dubbed the "first lady of country".  James would achieve a string of number ones in the late 1960s and early 1970s and remain successful until he opted to retire from the music industry in 1983.  All four have been inducted into the Country Music Hall of Fame in recognition of their contributions to the genre.

Chart history

References

1966-related lists
1966
1966 record charts